Monte Morello is the highest mountain (934 m.) in the Florentine valley, Italy. It is located to the north-west of Florence and it spreads across the borders of the municipalities of Florence, Vaglia, Sesto Fiorentino and Calenzano. 

Morello
Monte Morello